Minneke De Ridder (born 2 December 1980 in Lier) is a Belgian politician and is affiliated with the N-VA. She was elected as a member of the Belgian Chamber of Representatives in 2010.

Notes

Living people
Members of the Chamber of Representatives (Belgium)
New Flemish Alliance politicians
1980 births
People from Lier, Belgium
21st-century Belgian politicians
21st-century Belgian women politicians